Steelers usually refers to the Pittsburgh Steelers, an American football team which plays in the National Football League.

Steelers may also refer to:

 Pohang Steelers, a South Korean association football club
 Punjab Steelers, an Indian professional basketball team
 SC Bietigheim-Bissingen or Bietigheim Steelers, an ice hockey club from Germany
 Selkirk Steelers, a Canadian junior ice hockey club
 Sheffield Steelers, an ice hockey club from the United Kingdom
 Illawarra Steelers, an Australian former rugby league club 
 Kings Cross Steelers, a rugby union club for gay and bisexual men
 Kobelco Steelers, a Japanese rugby union team
 Kuopio Steelers, a Finnish american football club
 Hanoi Steelers, a Vietnamese football team
 The Steelers (music), vocal group from Chicago

See also
 Steel worker (disambiguation)
 Steeler (disambiguation)